Nabadowa is a small town within Southern Province in Sri Lanka.

See also
List of towns in Southern Province, Sri Lanka

External links

Populated places in Southern Province, Sri Lanka